The Bass Rock, also known as "the Bass", is a distinctive island off the coast of East Lothian, Scotland. Scottish emigrants named three islands in the United States after the Bass Rock:
Bass Rock may also refer to:

Bass Rock (Norfolk County, Massachusetts)
Bass Rock (Greenland), a small island in East Greenland, named for its resemblance to Bass Rock, Scotland

See also
Bass Rock (album), an album by Clyde Carson